Boneh-ye Sukhteh Char (also Romanized as Boneh-ye Sūkhteh Chār; also known as Boneh-ye Sūkhteh and Boneh-ye Sūkhteh Chāl) is a village in Howmeh Rural District, in the Central District of Bam County, Kerman Province, Iran. At the 2006 census, its population was 63, in 13 families.

References 

Populated places in Bam County